William Campion was the first Organist of Chichester Cathedral mentioned in the cathedral archives, and was paid 6 s. 8 d. for playing the 'organs in the choir' and 3 s. 4 d. for the 'organs in the Lady Chapel' in the last quarter of 1543 and twice again in 1544.

References 

16th-century English musicians
English organists
British male organists